Super Show 6 is the fourth Asia-wide concert tour and sixth tour overall by South Korean boy band Super Junior, in support of their seventh studio album, Mamacita. The world tour commenced with three shows in Seoul from September 19 to 21, 2014 and hit a total of 100 concerts for its Super Show series.

This tour marks the return of leader Leeteuk, who was discharged from mandatory military service in July 2014.

Concerts
The tour was announced on July 7, 2014, even before Super Junior starting the promotion for their seventh studio album, Mamacita. Tickets for the September 20–21 concert in Seoul went on sale on August 7 and were sold out in 9 minutes. Later, the group added one more day on September 19 due to high demand and the tickets went on sale on August 21 at 8PM KST. The concert on September 21 marks the 100th Super Show concert in the Super Show series.

On October 29 and 30, 2014, Super Junior launched Super Junior World Tour in Tokyo in Tokyo Dome, gathering over 110,000 fans. Super Junior launched solo concerts in Tokyo Dome three years in a row since 2012 and sold out tickets to the two-day concert. The members communicated with the fans in Japanese and announced the released of Japanese single Mamacita (Ayaya) on December 17, 2014, as well as the launch of the Fukuoka Dome concert on December 30, 2014.

On November 29 and 30, 2014, Super Junior launched World Tour Super Show 6 in Taipei in Taipei Arena for 22,000 fans. Tickets were also sold out for both rounds of the concert and it was attended by numerous media outlets, such as TVBS, The China Times, The Liberty Times and more. The group concluded the tour in Bangkok over two days on January 10 and 11, 2015 at the Impact Arena.

On May 27, 2015, SM Entertainment announced that Super Junior would hold encore concerts for Super Junior World Concert Super Show 6, which took place on July 11 and 12 at the Olympic Park Gymnastics Hall in Seoul. Like the Super Show 6 that was held in September 2014, the encore concerts would showcase performances of hit songs for both the group and individual members. Yesung, who was recently discharged from the military, rose to the stage with Super Junior after two years and four months.

Setlist

Tour dates

Personnel 
 Artists:
 Super Junior: Leeteuk, Heechul, Yesung (encore only), Kangin, Shindong (Seoul only), Sungmin (to Macau), Eunhyuk, Donghae, Siwon, Ryeowook and Kyuhyun
 Super Junior-M: Zhou Mi and Henry Lau
 Tour organizer: SM Entertainment, Shindong
 Tour promoter: Dream Maker Entercom, Shindong

Live album

Super Show 6 – Super Junior World Tour Concert Album is Super Junior's sixth live recorded album, released on 6 November 2015. This album contains two CDs with 36 live recordings from the Super Show 6 concerts held on September 19–21, 2014 at the Olympic Gymnastics Arena located in Seoul, South Korea.

Track listing

References

External links
 Dream Maker Entercom 
 Super Junior official homepage 
 Live Nation

2014 concert tours
2015 concert tours
Super Junior concert tours
K-pop concerts